Eagleby (formerly Philadelphia) is a suburb in the City of Logan, Queensland, Australia.

Geography
Eagleby is located on the southern bank of the Logan River at the juncture with the Albert which forms the southern and eastern boundary.  The Pacific Motorway marks the western boundary. Eagleby is northeast of Beenleigh, and was originally a suburb of Beenleigh.

History
Eagleby was originally known as Philadelphia.

In October 1905, tenders were called for the erection of a provisional school. Eagleby Provisional School opened in 1906. On 1 January 1909, it became Eagleby State School. It closed in 1966. It was located at 133 Eagleby Road. The school building was purchased for use as a private residence, but was removed circa 2021.

Eagleby South State School opened on 23 January 1978.

The fire station on the Pacific Motorway was built in September 1983.

On 25 January 1988, a new Eagleby State School opened at a new location.

Eagleby Learning Centre opened in 1992.

The median age of the Eagleby population was 37 years, 1 year below the national median of 38. Aboriginal and Torres Strait Islander people made up 4.4% of the population. 65.5% of people were born in Australia. The most common countries of birth were New Zealand 10.2%, England 4.5% and Philippines 1.2%. 81.4% of people spoke only English at home. Other languages spoken at home included Turkish 1.2% and Maori (New Zealand) 0.8%. The most common responses for religion were No Religion 31.4%, Catholic 15.9% and Anglican 14.7%.

Education 

Eagleby State School is a government primary (Prep-6) school for boys and girls at 222-2660 Fryar Road (corner of Herses Road). In 2018, the school had an enrolment of 548 students with 43 teachers (38 full-time equivalent) and 31 non-teaching staff (18 full-time equivalent). It includes a special education program.

Eagleby South State School is a government primary (Prep-6) school for boys and girls at the corner of 131-171 River Hills Road (corner of Fryar Road). In 2018, the school had an enrolment of 492 students with 39 teachers (36 full-time equivalent) and 27 non-teaching staff (19 full-time equivalent). It includes a special education program.

STEPS Positive Learning Centre is a specific-purpose primary and secondary (5-10) school 131-171 River Hills Road (corner of Fryar Road). The role of Positive Learning Centres is to re-engage with school-age children who need intervention to enable them to return to conventional schooling or to transition into vocational training.

Eagleby Learning Centre is a secondary (7-12) Centre for Continuing Secondary Education at 161 Herses Road. It provides secondary education with flexible delivery for "second chance learners", for school-age and adult students, who have disengaged from conventional schooling in the past.

There are no mainstream secondary schools in Eagleby. The nearest government secondary school is Beenleigh State High School in neighbouring Beenleigh to the south-east.

Facilities 
A waste water treatment plant is located in Eagleby.  The facility was established in 1967 and processes water in three stages before releasing it into the Albert River.

Amenities 
There is a post office at Eagleby Shopping Plaza at the corner of River Hills and Fryar Roads.  Major shopping centres and services are at Beenleigh and the Logan Hyperdome at Loganholme.  Eagleby is also the home of the Beenleigh Distillery and Twin Rivers Food Co Op.

Eagleby Community Hall is located at 112 Fryar Road.

The Eagleby branch of the Queensland Country Women's Association meets at Cowper Avenue.

Transport 
There is a bus service (Logan City Bus Service), TransLink 563 that runs approximately 6:00am to 7:00pm weekdays with a reduced service on Saturdays. The 553 runs at the west end of River Hills Road hourly into the evenings and on weekends, however this does not service the majority of homes in Eagleby.

See also

 Beenleigh Rum

References

External links

 
Eagleby community portal

Suburbs of Logan City